The Sun Belt Conference baseball tournament is the conference championship tournament in baseball for the Sun Belt Conference. The winner of the tournament receives the conference's automatic bid to the NCAA Division I baseball tournament. After Coastal Carolina University hosts the competition in Conway, South Carolina, in 2019, the tournament will move to a neutral site, Riverwalk Stadium in Montgomery, AL, from 2020 to 2024.

Tournament
The Sun Belt Conference Baseball Tournament is a ten team double-elimination tournament held annually at various sites in the Sun Belt Conference region.  The bottom four seeds play a one round single elimination play in game. The six teams with the best conference record at the end of the regular season earn automatic berths in the tournament. After the play-in round, the remaining eight teams will play 2 four team double-elimination brackets with a single elimination championship game between the bracket winners. The division winner with the best conference record will be seeded #1 and will play the lowest remaining seed from the play-in round. The winner of the other division will receive the #2 seed (regardless of overall conference ranking) and will play the higher seeded play-in game winner. The champion of the competition receives an automatic bid to the NCAA Division I baseball tournament.

History
The tournament started in 1978 as a four team double-elimination tournament.

In 1979 the tournament expanded to include six teams but still remained double-elimination.

The tournament expanded again in 1980 and included seven teams.

In 1981 the conference was divided into divisions and the top two teams in each division made the tournament, returning it to a four team double-elimination format.  It remained that way through 1985.

In 1986 the conference retained the division format but expanded the tournament to include the top four teams in each division, making the tournament an eight team double-elimination tournament.

In 1987, the conference returned to the a four team double-elimination format.

The tournament format was changed again in 1988 when it expanded to include the top three teams in each division, now making it a six team double-elimination tournament.  In 1995, the conference dropped the division format but kept the tournament format as a six team double-elimination tournament through 1998.

In 1999, the tournament expanded to an eight team double-elimination format.  The format was a double bracket round robin in 2011-2012.

In 2017, the Conference expanded the field to 10 teams, with the bottom four seeds playing a single-elimination play-in round before the standard eight team double-elimination bracket.

Champions

By Year

By school
As of July 1, 2022, there are 14 schools in the conference that competes in baseball.

Current members

Former members

External links
2008 Sun Belt Conference Baseball Media Guide

References